Golan Haji, (Arabic: جولان حاجي) a Syrian Kurdish writer, poet, and translator, who was born in 1977. He has published three poetry collections including the "Dark Club", which won the first prize in the Muhammad Al-Maghout Poetry Competition in 2006. He has translated several books from English into Arabic such as "Palm-of-the-Hand Stories" by Yasunari Kawabata and the "Dark Harbor" by Mark Strand.

Education and career 
Golan Haji, a poet and writer, was born in Amouda which is a Kurdish town in the north of Syria in 1977. He lived in Damascus and then moved to settle in Paris. He studied at the University of Damascus and earned a bachelor's degree in medicine and a postgraduate degree in pathology. Haji started his literary career when he published his first collection of poetry "Called in Darkness" in 2004 which won the Muhammad Al-Maghout Prize in poetry. Then, in 2008, he published his second collection of poetry named "Someone Sees You as a Monster" which was published during the even celebrating Damascus as the Capital of culture. In 2016, Haji also published a book of prose which he interviewed a number of Syrian women who spoke about their experience and stories during the Syrian war. Haji has also translated several English books into Arabic including "Strange Case of Dr. Jekyll and Mr. Hyde" by Robert Louis Stevenson, "Palm-of-the-Hand Stories" by Yasunari Kawabata, and the "Dark Harbor" by Mark Strand.

Works 

 "Called in Darkness" (original title: Nada fi Al Dolomat), 2004
 “Someone Sees You as a Monster” (original title: thamata mat yaraka wahshan), 2008
 “The Balance of Harm” (original title: Mizan Al Atha), 2016

Books 

 “Until the War: Women in the Syrian Revolution” (original title: ila an kamat al harb: nesaa fi thawra al Suryiaa), 2016

Translation 

 “Al Mirfaa al Muthlim” (original title: Dark Harbor), 2002
 “Dafatr modelima” (original title: The Secret Notebooks), 2011
 “Stevenson tahta Ashgar al Nakheel” (original title: Stevenson Under the Palm Trees), 2017
 “Hai Asakosa” (original title: Palm-of-the-hand Stories), 2019

Awards 

 2006: He won the first prize in the Muhammad Al-Maghout Poetry Competition for his collections of poetry "Called in the Darkness".

References 

Kurdish writers
Syrian poets
1977 births
Living people